Adrian Wewer, O.F.M. (April 14, 1836 – March 15, 1914), was a German-born Franciscan lay brother who was the architect of more than 100 churches, college buildings, seminaries, schools, friaries, convents, and hospitals throughout the United States. He primarily worked in the Neo-Gothic style of architecture then popular.

Life
He was born Antonius Wewer in 1836 in Harsewinkel, in the Prussian state of Westphalia, and as a teenager was trained as a carpenter. In 1858 he was admitted to the novitiate of the Friars Minor of the Province of the Holy Cross located in Warendorf in the Kingdom of Saxony, at which time he was given his religious name of Adrian. That same year the friars received a request from Henry Damian Juncker, the Bishop of Alton in Illinois, to help to care for the large German Catholic population which had settled in the region.

The first Friars Minor arrived that same year, and settled in Teutopolis, Illinois. Wewer was one of a group of five friars who arrived in November 1862 to assist with projects of the friars in Illinois and Missouri. He was initially based at St. Anthony of Padua Parish in St. Louis, Missouri, where he designed the church built 1864-1869, after he had built his first church in Trowbridge, Illinois, in Shelby County, in 1864. He also participated in the design of the interior altars and furnishings of the first St. Francis Solanus Church in Quincy, Illinois. After that church was demolished in 1887, the altars were moved to the new church.

Wewer's work was so prolific and well appreciated, that, on the occasion of his Golden Jubilee as a member of the Order in 1908, he received a personal letter of appreciation from Pope Pius X. He was later sent to San Francisco, where he died in 1914.

Wewer's most notable structures are the Conception Abbey in Conception, Missouri and Francis Hall at Quincy University in Quincy, Illinois.

Works

Indiana
Archdiocese of Indianapolis:
 Sacred Heart of Jesus Church, Indianapolis, Indiana
Diocese of Evansville:'
 St. Anthony of Padua Church, Evansville, Indiana

IllinoisDiocese of Springfield in Illinois: St. Mary Church, Quincy, Illinois
 St. Francis Solanus Church, Quincy, Illinois (demolished, furnishings retained in the new church)
 St. Patrick Church, Trowbridge, Illinois (demolished)
 St. Anthony of Padua Church, Quincy, Illinois (demolished)
 St. Augustine Church, Chicago, Illinois (demolished)

MissouriArchdiocese of St. Louis: St. Anthony of Padua Church, St. Louis, Missouri (demolished)
 St. Francis Borgia Church, Washington, MissouriDiocese of Kansas City-Saint Joseph: Conception Abbey, Conception, Missouri
 St. Columban Church, Chillicothe, MissouriDiocese of Jefferson City, Missouri: St. George Church, Hermann, Missouri
 St. Mary Church, New Cambria, Missouri

WisconsinDiocese of Superior: St. Francis Xavier Church, Superior, Wisconsin

CaliforniaArchdiocese of San Francisco: St. Boniface Church, San Francisco, CaliforniaDiocese of Sacramento:''
 St. Francis Church, Sacramento, California

References

External links
Thefriars.org biography

1836 births
1914 deaths
People from Harsewinkel
People from the Province of Westphalia
German Friars Minor
Roman Catholic religious brothers
Prussian emigrants to the United States
German Roman Catholic missionaries
German ecclesiastical architects
Architects of Roman Catholic churches
American Friars Minor
American ecclesiastical architects
Architects from Illinois
Gothic Revival architects
Roman Catholic missionaries in the United States